The 2013 Big Ten Conference football season was the 118th season for the Big Ten. The conference began its season on Thursday, August 29, as Minnesota and Indiana began their 2013 season of NCAA Division I FBS (Football Bowl Subdivision) competition. Michigan State began their season the following day, and the rest of the conference began their season on September 1.

This was the league's final season as a 12-team conference before Maryland and Rutgers join the Big Ten Conference for the 2014 season. It was also the final season with the "Leaders" and "Legends" divisions; when Maryland and Rutgers join, the conference will reorganize its divisions on a pure geographic basis. The six schools in the Central Time Zone will be joined by Purdue in the new West Division, with the other schools making up the East Division. Under the new setup, the only protected cross-division rivalry game will be Indiana–Purdue.

Michigan State upset undefeated Ohio State to win the Big Ten Championship Game.  The B1G put seven teams into bowl games, including two into the BCS with Michigan State going to the Rose Bowl and Ohio State to the Orange Bowl. The B1G went 2-5 in bowl games with the only wins coming from Michigan State in the Rose Bowl and Nebraska in the Gator Bowl.

Rankings

Spring games
April 6
Nebraska

April 12
Illinois

April 13
Indiana
Michigan
Northwestern
Ohio State * at Paul Brown Stadium in Cincinnati
Purdue

April 20
Michigan State
Penn State
Wisconsin

April 27
Iowa
Minnesota
Wisconsin

Schedule

All times Eastern time.

† denotes Homecoming game

Week 1

Week 2

Week 3

Week 4

Week 5

Week 6

Week 7

Week 8

Week 9

Week 10

Week 11

Week 12

Week 13

Week 14

Big Ten Championship Game

Bowl games
The Big Ten did not have enough teams available to fill the Heart of Dallas Bowl and Little Caesars Pizza Bowl due to landing two teams in the BCS and also a lack of bowl eligible teams.

Records against FBS conferences
2013 records against FBS conferences:

Through January 3, 2014

Players of the Week

Players of the Year

All-Conference Players
Coaches All-Conference Selections

HONORABLE MENTION: Illinois: Jonathan Brown, Steve Hull, Nathan Scheelhaase; Indiana: Ted Bolser, Tevin Coleman, Cody Latimer, Jason Spriggs; Iowa: Austin Blythe, Conor Boffeli, Christian Kirksey, B.J. Lowery, Tanner Miller, Louis Trinca-Pasat; Michigan: Jibreel Black, Michael Schofield; Michigan State: Jack Allen, Fou Fonoti, Dan France, Jeremy Langford, Marcus Rush, Trae Waynes; Minnesota: Caleb Bak, Aaron Hill, Peter Mortell, Eric Murray; Nebraska: Jason Ankrah, Kenny Bell, Corey Cooper, Andrew Rodriguez, Jeremiah Sirles; Northwestern: Ibraheim Campbell, Tyler Scott, Brandon Vitabile; Ohio State: C.J. Barnett, Drew Basil, Joey Bosa, Doran Grant, Marcus Hall, Jeff Heuerman, Cameron Johnston, Devin Smith; Penn State: Adrian Amos, Glenn Carson, Christian Hackenberg, Ty Howle, Jordan Lucas, C.J. Olaniyan, Donovan Smith; Purdue: Ricardo Allen; Wisconsin: Beau Allen, Rob Havenstein, Tyler Marz, Pat Muldoon, Jacob Pedersen, Dezmen Southward.

Coaches selected six players as First Team All-Conference defensive backs and two players as First Team punters which resulted in less second team selections

Unanimous selections in ALL CAPS

Media All-Conference Selections

HONORABLE MENTION: Illinois: Houston Bates, Steve Hull; Indiana: Tim Bennett, Ted Bolser, Tevin Coleman, Mitch Ewald, Collin Rahrig, Jason Spriggs; Iowa: Austin Blythe, Conor Boffeli, Carl Davis, Anthony Hitchens, Christian Kirksey, Casey Kreiter, John Lowdermilk, Tanner Miller, Louis Trinca-Pasat; Brett Van Sloten; Michigan: Jibreel Black, Frank Clark, Devin Gardner, Brendan Gibbons, Raymon Taylor; Michigan State: Connor Cook, Fou Fonoti; Dan France, Michael Geiger, Jeremy Langford, Isaiah Lewis, Marcus Rush, Trae Waynes; Minnesota: Caleb Bak, Josh Campion, Zac Epping, Peter Mortell, Eric Murray, Brock Vereen; Nebraska: Jason Ankrah, Kenny Bell, Cole Pensick, Andrew Rodriguez, Jeremiah Sirles, Pat Smith; Northwestern: Chi Chi Ariguzo, Ibraheim Campbell, Damien Proby, Brandoo Vitabile; Ohio State: C.J. Barnett, Drew Basil, Joey Bosa, Corey Brown, Doran Grant, Marcus Hall, Jeff Heuerman, Cameron Johnston; Penn State: Glenn Carson, Sam Ficken, Christian Hackenberg, Ty Howle, Jesse James, Jordan Lucas, C.J. Olaniyan, Donovan Smith; Wisconsin: Beau Allen, Michael Caputo, Tyler Marz, Pat Muldoon, Jacob Pedersen, Sojourn Shelton, Dezmen Southward, Joel Stave.

All-Americans
There are many outlets that award All-America honors in football.  The NCAA uses five official selectors to also determine Consensus and Unanimous All-America honors.  The five teams used by the NCAA to compile the consensus team are from the Associated Press, the AFCA, the FWAA, The Sporting News and the Walter Camp Football Foundation.  A point system is used to calculate the consensus honors.  The point system consists of three points for first team, two points for second team and three points for third team. No honorable mention or fourth team or lower are used in the computation.

The teams are compiled by position and the player accumulating the most points at each position is named a Consensus All-American. If there is a tie at a position in football for first team then the players who are tied shall be named to the team.  A player named first-team by all five of the NCAA-recognized selectors is recognized as a Unanimous All-American.

2013 First Team All-Americans

Academic All-Americans
Once again the Big Ten led all conferences with eight student-athletes being named to the Capital One Academic All-America first or second teams as announced by CoSIDA.  The Big Ten has now led all FBS conferences in Academic All-America selections for nine straight seasons, with a total of 72 honorees over that time span.

First Team: Mark Murphy, Indiana; James Morris, Iowa; Max Bullough, Michigan State; Mike Sadler, Michigan State; Spencer Long, Nebraska; John Urschel, Penn State; Second Team: Jake Long, Nebraska; C.J. Zimmerer, Nebraska.

National Award Winners
 Pat Narduzzi, Michigan State - Frank Broyles Award (top assistant coach)
 Darqueze Dennard, Michigan State - Jim Thorpe Award (top defensive back)
 John Urschel, Penn State - Campbell Trophy ("academic Heisman")
 Jared Abbrederis, Wisconsin – Burlsworth Trophy (top player who began as a walk-on)

Attendance

2014 NFL Draft

30 Big Ten athletes were drafted in the 2014 NFL Draft.

N.B: In the explanations below, (D) denotes trades that took place during the 2014 Draft, while (PD) indicates trades completed pre-draft.

Round two

Round three

Round four

Round seven

Trade references

NFL Draft Selections by NCAA Conference
SEC - 49
ACC - 42
Pac-12 - 34
Big Ten - 30
Big 12 - 17
Mountain West - 16
American - 12
C-USA - 9
Independents - 9
MAC - 8
Sun Belt - 4

Non-FBS Conferences - 26

Head coaches

 Tim Beckman, Illinois
 Kevin R. Wilson, Indiana
 Kirk Ferentz, Iowa
 Brady Hoke, Michigan
 Mark Dantonio, Michigan State
 Jerry Kill, Minnesota

 Bo Pelini, Nebraska
 Pat Fitzgerald, Northwestern
 Urban Meyer, Ohio State
 Bill O'Brien, Penn State
 Darrell Hazell, Purdue
 Gary Andersen, Wisconsin

References